Kuroko's Basketball is an anime series adapted from the manga series of the same name by Tadatoshi Fujimaki. It is produced by Production I.G and directed by Shunsuke Tada, it began broadcasting on Mainichi Broadcasting System on  April 7, 2012 with Tokyo MX, Nippon BS Broadcasting, and Animax beginning broadcast in the weeks following. The final episode of season 1 aired on September 22, 2012 and it was announced in the seasonally published Jump NEXT! winter issue that a second season has been green-lit, and aired on October 5, 2013. The series was also simulcast on Crunchyroll as part of their spring lineup of anime titles. Kuroko's Basketball centres on the "Generation of Miracles", the regulars of the Teikō Middle School basketball team who rose to distinction by demolishing all competition. After graduating from middle school, these five stars went to different high schools with top basketball teams. However, a fact few know is that there was another player of the "Generation of Miracles", the phantom sixth player. This mysterious player is now a freshman at Seirin High, a new school with a powerful, if little-known, team. Now, Tetsuya Kuroko, the phantom sixth member of the "Generation of Miracles", and Taiga Kagami, a naturally talented player who spent most of middle school in America, are aiming to bring Seirin to the top of Japan, taking on Kuroko's old teammates one by one.

The series' first DVD and Blu-ray compilation was released on July 27, 2012 with a new DVD/Blu-ray compilation being released monthly. As of December 2012, seven DVD/Blu-ray compilations have been released.

On October 19, 2020, the SAG-AFTRA listed and approved an English dub for the series under the "Netflix Dubbing Agreement". The first season's English dub debuted on Netflix on January 15, 2021, with its second season on May 15, and its third season on September 18.

Series overview

Episode list

Season 1 (2012)

Season 2 (2013–14)

Season 3 (2015)

OVAs

See also

References

 
Lists of anime episodes